"Walk This Way" is a song by Danish singer-songwriter MØ. The song was released as a digital download in Denmark on 3 August 2014 through Chess Club and RCA Victor as the seventh and final single from her debut studio album No Mythologies to Follow (2014). The song peaked at number 33 on the Danish Singles Chart.

The music video for the song was directed by Emile Rafael, and was commissioned by British magazine i-D.

Track listing

In popular culture

The song was featured in a campaign advertisement for Boohoo.com.

Charts

Release history

References

MØ songs
2013 songs
2014 singles
Songs written by MØ